César Quintero may refer to:

 César Quintero (baseball) (born 1982), Panamanian baseball player
 César Quintero (footballer) (born 1988), Colombian footballer